Sant Quirze de Besora is a municipality in the comarca of Osona in Catalonia, Spain. It is situated on the banks of the Ter river in the north of the comarca. It is on the main communication route between Barcelona and Puigcerdà, served by the C-17 road and a station on the RENFE railway line. It is also linked to Prats de Lluçanès and the Berguedà by the C-149 road. There is a tradition of textile manufacture in the town, as well as a distillery and a hydroelectric power station.

Sant Quirze de Besora became part of Osona in the comarcal revision of 1990: previously it formed part of the Ripollès.

Demography

References

 Panareda Clopés, Josep Maria; Rios Calvet, Jaume; Rabella Vives, Josep Maria (1989). Guia de Catalunya, Barcelona: Caixa de Catalunya.  (Spanish).  (Catalan).

External links
Official website 
 Government data pages 

Municipalities in Osona